Maurice Pelling (1920–1973) was a British art director. He won an Academy Award in the category Best Art Direction for the film Cleopatra.

Selected filmography
 Cleopatra (1963)

References

External links

1920 births
1973 deaths
British art directors
Best Art Direction Academy Award winners